Ravansar County is in Kermanshah province, Iran, part of what is unofficially referred to as Iranian Kurdistan. The capital of the county is the city of Ravansar. At the 2006 census, the county's population was 44,983 in 10,012 households. The following census in 2011 counted 46,395 people in 12,140 households. At the 2016 census, the county's population was 47,657 in 13,790 households.

The county is bounded in the north by Paveh County and Javanrud County, and in the south by Kermanshah County.

Administrative divisions

The population history and structural changes of Ravansar County's administrative divisions over three consecutive censuses are shown in the following table. The latest census shows two districts, six rural districts, and two cities.

Archaeology

The Ravansar region has much of archaeological interest. Evidence of early human occupation has been found in a number of caves around Ravansar, such as Mar Koulian and Mar Jawri. The area was important during the Iron Age and Achaemenid dynasty, as can be seen in the rock-cut tomb of Farhad and column bases found around Qoleh Rock north of the town.

References

 

Counties of Kermanshah Province